State Highway 74 (SH-74 ) is a state highway in  Bihar State. It covers three major districts (Vaishali district, Muzaffarpur district and East Champaran district) of Bihar state. This state highway starts from Hajipur. In Hajipur this road is also known as Hajipur Lalganj road.

Route 
The route of SH-74 from east to west is as follows:

 Hajipur
 Gadai Sarai
 Ishmailpur
 Lalganj
 Vaishali (ancient city) 
 Sadipur (Muzaffarpur)
 Paroo (Muzaffarpur)
 Sahebganj
 Kesaria
 Rampur Khajuria (East Champaran)
 Sangrampur (East Champaran)
 Areraj

Note:
SH-74 ends at Areraj. After that state highway (SH-54) move east towards Motihari and move west towards Bettiah.

References 

State Highways in Bihar
Transport in Hajipur